El Anseur is a town and commune in Bordj Bou Arréridj Province, Algeria. According to the 1998 census it has a population of 11,170.

References

Communes of Bordj Bou Arréridj Province
Bordj Bou Arréridj Province